The Touch of an Angel is a 2015 Polish documentary film directed by Marek Tomasz Pawłowski. It is a personal, poetic memoir of a deaf man who returns to the places where he found refuge as a Jewish boy during World War II. He finds his hiding places and bunkers still standing, bringing back horrific memories. The film emphasizes the role of Poles in saving persecuted Jews and indifference of the international community at large in the face of Nazi threats.

Story 
Henryk Schoenker, a son of the last leader of the Jewish Community in Oświęcim reveals to the world an unknown story of Jews` legal opportunity to emigrate. Before the idea of the Auschwitz-Birkenau concentration camp was conceived, the Office for Jewish Immigration to Palestine was established in Oświęcim in the fall of 1939. Leon Schoenker, the narrator's father, was tasked to set it up on order by the German military authorities. Thousands of people from all areas of Silesia began to arrive to the town of Oświęcim in the hope of being saved from persecution.

When the elder Schoenker was called to Berlin to report to Adolf Eichmann, he did it enthusiastically, presenting a matter-of-fact plan of international action. Unfortunately, the idea of the legal emigration came to nothing because of the world's indifference.

Completely deaf since the war, Henryk Schoenker comes back to his family's ruined residence that still echoes those distant events. “The horrible sounds of my childhood got inside me as if I were a seashell. Perhaps that is why I became deaf: so I would never forget them,” he says in the film, following the footsteps of his six-year wartime ordeal.

Cast 
 Henryk Schoenker - as himself
 Marta Popławska – Mother Mina Schoenker
 Piotr Józef Tomaszewski – Father Leon Schoenker
 Karol Klęczar – Heniu Schoenker
 Zuzia Dudek – Lusia Schoenker
 Bogdan Lęcznar – John Gottowt
 Włodzimierz Nowotarski – Angel
 Mirosław Kramarczyk – Fiddler Birnbaum
 Izabela Warykiewicz – Woman With a Baby
 Oliwka Kania – Fransineke
 Dawid Roszkowski – Ignaś
 Jacek Flasz – Bocian
 Mirosław Ganobis – Officer SD Wieliczka
 Marek Mikołajczyk – Soldier With a Dog
 Mirosław Śmielak – Carpenter
 Julia Niedziela – Carpenter's Mother

and others

Production 
The film was shot in authentic interiors in Oświęcim, Kraków, Wieliczka, Bochnia and Tarnów. Historically significant places were able to give testimony to these past events before most of the buildings were destroyed a few months after the shooting of "The Touch of an Angel" was finished.

In the documentary, professional actors and numerous residents of Oświęcim play the real characters from the past.  Because everyone had to resemble their wartime counterparts, casting took many months.  The man performing the title Angel had to grow gray hair and a beard for a year, keeping the cause of the change of his appearance a secret from his family and friends.  Birnbaum, a violin virtuoso, was played by a real violinist from Oświęcim.  Beyond their acting talents, the children had to display fortitude in extremely difficult weather conditions.

In addition, the documentary introduces the “archicollage” (archive collage) style – an original invention of the director Marek Tomasz Pawłowski and the graphic designer Robert Manowski that is a new artistic means of recreating past events.  It is also worth mentioning that cinematographer Jacek Januszyk shot the movie on a Red Epic camera, thus making “The Touch of an Angel” the first Polish documentary made this way.

The project was consulted by a historian, Zbigniew Stańczyk.

Screenings

Film Festivals 

 BIAF Festival Batumi
 Chagrin  Film Festival Ohio
 Denver  Film Festival
 Polish Film Festival in America Chicago
 Polish Film Festiwal Ann Arbor
 Bilbao Film Festival
 San Diego Jewish Film Festival
 Miami Jewish Film Festival
 Jewish Film Festival
 Jewish Film Festival in Washington
 Gdynia Film Festival

Special screenings 

 Museum of Tolerance, Los Angeles 
 Museum of Holocaust, Los Angeles
 Museum of Jewish Heritage, New York
 International Public Television Screening Conference (INPUT), Tokyo

Critical response 
Annette Insdorf from The Huffington Post, a film critic and great promoter of Polish cinema, was the first to present the documentary to the American audience. She pointed out the legitimacy of the use of the film's artistic, poetic language called by the director the archicollage.

David Noh from Film Journal International writes that the up-close, personal approach of this Holocaust doc proves to be its very strength, through one man's harrowing yet inspiring reminiscences. This film, in the ocean of Holocaust-themed works, does really put the viewer in searing human contact with this greatest of tragedies and horrors.

The movie was also commented in New York Times by Neil Genzlinger. He appreciates that the movie stands out from other documentaries about Holocaust survivors, thanks to re-enactments and manipulated still images that seek to make the narrative come alive. Genzlinger also praises the main character, Henryk Schoenker, for being an absorbing tour guide to his own life.

Avi Offer of NYC Movie Guru gave The Touch of an Angel a very positive review. According to his critique, the film is emotionally resonating, gripping and vital and Henryk Schoenker is a coherent storyteller.

References

External links 

 
 The official Zoyda Art Production website

2015 films
Polish documentary films
2015 documentary films
2010s Polish-language films